Minister of Economy and Finance is the person in charge of the public finances of Gabon, and current head of the ministry of economy and finance.

Ministers responsible for finance
André Gustave Anguilé, 1960-1965
Léonard Badinga, 1965-1966
Pierre Mebaley, 1966-1969
Augustin Boumah, 1969-1972
Paul Moukambi, 1972-1976
Jérôme Okinda, 1976-1983
Jean-Pierre Lemboumba-Lepandou, 1983-1990
Léon Mébiame, 1990-1991
Paul Toungui, 1991-1994
Marcel Doupamby Matoka, 1994-1999
Emile Doumba, 1999-2002
Paul Toungui, 2002-2008
Blaise Louembe, 2008-2012
Rose Christiane Raponda, 2012-2014
Christian Magnagna, 2014-2016
Mathias Otounga Ossibadjouo, 2016-2017
Jean-Fidèle Otandault, 2017-2019
Roger Owono Mba, 2019
Jean-Marie Ogandaga, December 2019 -

See also
 Government of Gabon
 Economy of Gabon

External links
 Website of the Ministry of Economy and Finance

References

Finance
Finance Ministers
Politicians

1960 establishments in Gabon